CH Gasteiz is an ice hockey team in Vitoria, Spain. They play in the Superliga Espanola de Hockey Hielo, the top level of ice hockey in Spain.

History
CH Gasteiz was founded in 1975, and began playing in the Superliga. The team did not participate in the 1976-77 season, but returned from 1978-1982. The club was relegated to the Segunda Division for the 1983 season. They won the league title, and were thus promoted back to the Superliga. Gasteiz continued playing in the Superliga until it suspended operations from 1986-88. The club then participated from 1988-2005, before taking two years off from 2005-2007. They returned to the Superliga from 2007-2009.

After the 2008–09 season, the club was dissolved.

Achievements
Segunda Division champion: 1983

External links
 Official website
 Spanish Ice Hockey Federation

Ice hockey teams in the Basque Country
Ice hockey clubs established in 1975
Ice hockey clubs disestablished in 2009
1975 establishments in Spain
Sport in Vitoria-Gasteiz
2009 disestablishments in Spain